Streptomyces rubrus is a bacterium species from the genus of Streptomyces which has been isolated from the sponge Haliclona sp. in Tateyama, Chiba in Japan.

See also 
 List of Streptomyces species

References

Further reading

External links
Type strain of Streptomyces rubrus at BacDive -  the Bacterial Diversity Metadatabase	

rubrus
Bacteria described in 2011